A referendum on convening a National Assembly to draft a new constitution was held in Estonia between 23 and 25 February 1936. It was approved by 76.1% of voters with an 82.9% turnout. Elections to the National Assembly were held in December.

Results

References

Referendums in Estonia
1936 referendums
1936 in Estonia